This is a list of airports in Perth, Western Australia.



List of airports
The list is sorted by the name of the community served, click the sort buttons in the table header to switch listing order.

Defunct airports

See also
 List of airports in Western Australia

 Perth
Perth
Perth
Lists of buildings and structures in Perth, Western Australia
Transport in Perth, Western Australia